Jarqoʻrgʻon is a district of Surxondaryo Region in Uzbekistan. The capital lies at the city Jarqoʻrgʻon. The district consists of one city (Jarqoʻrgʻon), 5 urban-type settlements (Kakaydi, Minor, Qoraqursoq, Markaziy Surxon, Kafrun) and 7 rural communities (Oqqoʻrgʻon, Jarqoʻrgʻon, Dehqonobod, Minor, Surxon, Chorjoʻy, Sharq Yulduzi).

The 12th century Jarkurgan minaret is located in the village Minor.

References

Districts of Uzbekistan
Surxondaryo Region